Fredrik Svensson (born April 13, 1975) is a Swedish professional ice hockey defenceman, currently playing with AIK of the Elitserien (SEL). His youth team is Skå IK.

References 

1975 births
AIK IF players
Espoo Blues players
HC Ambrì-Piotta players
HPK players
Ilves players
Malmö Redhawks players
Living people
Luleå HF players
Södertälje SK players
Swedish ice hockey defencemen
Ice hockey people from Stockholm